Stephen Pierce Hayden Duggan (December 20, 1870, New York City - August 18, 1950, Stamford, Connecticut) was a United States scholar and educator known as the "apostle of internationalism".

Biography
He was educated at the College of the City of New York (CCNY) where, after completing his undergraduate and some graduate work in 1896, he began teaching while pursuing graduate studies at Columbia University, where he received a Ph.D. in 1902. He was a professor of diplomatic history and later the history of education at CCNY, and became head of the education department in 1906.

Duggan founded The Institute of International Education in 1919, together with Nobel Laureates Elihu Root and Nicholas Murray Butler, and was the first director (until 1946). He was director of Council on Foreign Relations (1921–1950).

Family
Duggan was married to Sarah Alice Elsesser, who was a director of the Negro Welfare League of White Plains, New York.

Their son Laurence Duggan was an economist and State Department official who was suspected of being a Soviet agent.

Works 

 The Eastern Question: A Study in Diplomacy (1902)
 A Student's Textbook in the History of Education (1916)
 The League of Nations: The Principle and the Practice (1919)

References

External links 
 
 Publications by Stephen Duggan at WorldCat.

International relations scholars
American political scientists
American male journalists
Historians from New York (state)
City College of New York alumni
City College of New York faculty
Columbia University alumni
1870 births
1950 deaths
Journalists from New York City